Rangers Football Club is a Scottish professional football club based in the Govan district of Glasgow which plays in the Scottish Premiership. Although not its official name, it is often referred to as Glasgow Rangers outside Scotland. The fourth-oldest football club in Scotland, Rangers was founded by four teenage boys as they walked through West End Park (now Kelvingrove Park) in March 1872 where they discussed the idea of forming a football club, and played its first match against the now defunct Callander at the Fleshers' Haugh area of Glasgow Green in May of the same year. Rangers' home ground, Ibrox Stadium, designed by stadium architect Archibald Leitch and opened in 1929, is a Category B listed building and the third-largest football stadium in Scotland. The club has always played in royal blue shirts.

Rangers is the most successful club in Scottish football. The club has won the Scottish League title a record 55 times, the Scottish Cup 34 times, the Scottish League Cup a record 27 times and the domestic treble on seven occasions, a joint world record shared with rivals Celtic. Rangers won the European Cup Winners' Cup in 1972 after being losing finalists twice, in 1961 (the first British club to reach a UEFA tournament final) and 1967. The club has lost a further two European finals; they reached the UEFA Cup Final in 2008 and a fourth runners-up finish in European competition came in the UEFA Europa League Final in 2022.

Rangers has a long-standing rivalry with Celtic, the two Glasgow clubs being collectively known as the Old Firm, which is considered one of the world's biggest football derbies. With more than 600 Rangers supporters' clubs in 35 countries worldwide, Rangers has one of the largest fanbases in world football. The club holds the record for the largest travelling support in football history, when an estimated 200,000 Rangers fans arrived in the city of Manchester for the 2008 UEFA Cup Final. Rangers also took the largest ever travelling support abroad when an estimated 100,000 fans arrived in Seville for the 2022 UEFA Europa League Final.

One of the 11 original members of the Scottish Football League, Rangers remained in the top division continuously until a financial crisis during the 2011–12 season saw the club enter administration and the original company liquidated with the assets moved to a new company structure. The club was accepted as an associate member of the Scottish Football League and placed in the fourth tier of the Scottish football league system in time for the start of the following season. Rangers then won three promotions in four years, returning to the Premiership for the start of the 2016–17 season. While in the Scottish lower divisions, Rangers became the only club in Scotland to have won every domestic trophy. In 2020–21, Rangers won the Scottish Premiership, their first Scottish championship in ten years, a then world record fifty-fifth league win. It also stopped rivals Celtic in their quest to break the domestic record by winning ten titles in a row.

History

Formation, early years and William Wilton

Rangers were formed by four founders – brothers Moses McNeil and Peter McNeil, Peter Campbell and William McBeath – who met at West End Park (now known as Kelvingrove Park) in March 1872. Rangers' first match, in May that year, was a goalless friendly draw with Callander on Glasgow Green. David Hill was also a founder member. In 1873, the club held its first annual meeting and staff were elected. By 1876, Rangers had its first international player, with Moses McNeil representing Scotland in a match against Wales. In 1877, Rangers reached the Scottish Cup final; after drawing the first game, Rangers refused to turn up for the replay and the cup was awarded to Vale of Leven. Rangers won the Glasgow Merchants Charity Cup the following year against Vale of Leven 2–1, their first major cup. The first-ever match against Celtic took place in 1888, the year after the East End club's establishment. Rangers lost 5–2 in a friendly to an opposition composed largely of guest players from Hibernian.

The 1890–91 season saw the inception of the Scottish Football League, and Rangers, by then playing at the first Ibrox Stadium, were one of ten original members. The club's first-ever league match, on 16 August 1890, resulted in a 5–2 victory over Heart of Midlothian. After finishing joint-top with Dumbarton, a play-off held at Cathkin Park finished 2–2 and the title was shared for the only time in its history. Rangers' first-ever Scottish Cup win came in 1894 after a 3–1 final victory over rivals Celtic. By the start of the 20th century, Rangers had won two league titles and three Scottish Cups. During William Wilton's time as match secretary and then team manager, Rangers won ten league titles.

Bill Struth and Scot Symon
Taking over as manager after William Wilton's death in 1920, Bill Struth was Rangers' most successful manager, guiding the club to 14 league titles before the onset of the Second World War. On 2 January 1939 a British league attendance record was broken as 118,567 fans turned out to watch Rangers beat Celtic in the traditional New Year's Day Old Firm match. Leading the club for 34 years until 1954, Struth won more trophies than any manager in Scottish Football history, amassing 18 league championships, 10 Scottish Cups, two League Cups, seven war-time championships, 19 Glasgow Cups, 17 Glasgow Merchant Charity Cups and other war-time honours. During the wartime regional league setup, Rangers achieved their highest score against Celtic with an 8–1 win in the Southern Football League. Under Struth's reign Rangers managed to set a new record of becoming the first club in Britain and second club in Europe after MTK Budapest to win nine consecutive league championships in a row from the 1938–39 season until the 1946–47 season.

Scot Symon continued Struth's success, winning six league championships, five Scottish Cups and four League Cups, becoming the second manager to win the domestic treble in 1963–64 season, the era of 'Slim' Jim Baxter, one of the club's greatest players. Rangers also lost by their biggest Old Firm margin of 7–1.

Rangers reached the semi-finals of the European Cup in 1960, losing to German club Eintracht Frankfurt by a record aggregate 12–4 for a Scottish team. In 1961 Rangers became the first British team to reach a European final when they contested the Cup Winners' Cup final against Italian side Fiorentina, only to lose 4–1 on aggregate. Rangers lost again in the final of the same competition in 1967, by a single goal, after extra time, to Bayern Munich.

Ibrox disaster, European success and Jock Wallace

The Ibrox disaster occurred on 2 January 1971 when large-scale crushing on a stairway exit at the culmination of an Old Firm game claimed 66 lives. An enquiry concluded that the crush was likely to have happened ten minutes after the final whistle and to have been triggered by someone falling on the stairs. A benefit match to raise funds for the victims' families took place after the disaster, a joint Rangers and Celtic team playing a Scotland XI at Hampden, watched by 81,405 fans.

In 1972, Rangers emerged from the tragedy of the previous year to finally achieve success on the European stage. A Colin Stein goal and a Willie Johnston double helped secure a 3–2 victory over Dynamo Moscow at the Nou Camp, Barcelona, to lift the European Cup Winners' Cup. Captain John Greig received the trophy in a small room within the Nou Camp following pitch invasions by Rangers fans reacting to the heavy handed tactics of the Spanish police, the majority of whom had been brought in from outwith Catalonia. Rangers were banned from Europe for two years for the behaviour of their fans, later reduced on appeal to one year.

The following season saw the club compete in the first ever European Super Cup, although the European ban saw it officially recognised as Rangers centenary anniversary match. The side played the European Cup holders Ajax, who had first proposed the idea, in January 1973. The Dutch side proved too strong and recorded a 6–3 aggregate win, with Rangers losing 1–3 at Ibrox and 3–2 in Amsterdam.

Emerging from the shadows of Jock Stein's Celtic side, Rangers regained ascendancy with notable domestic success under the stewardship of manager Jock Wallace. In his first season in charge – the club's centenary – Rangers won the Scottish Cup at Hampden in front of 122,714 supporters. In 1974–75, Wallace led Rangers to their first League championship triumph in 11 years, before winning the treble the following season, repeating the historic feat in 1977–78.

John Greig served as manager for five years but was unable to achieve the success as a manager that he had as a player. Unable to win the league during his reign, he was replaced by Wallace returning in 1983. Wallace was unable to repeat the success of his first period in charge with a win ratio of less than 50%, and was himself replaced by Graeme Souness in 1986.

Graeme Souness, Walter Smith and 9-in-a-row
Every year from the 1988–89 season until the 1996–97 season, Rangers won the league title. This nine-in-a-row achievement equalled Celtic's record, set prior to the forming of the Scottish Football League Premier Division, subsequent to which competing teams met four times a season. The first three of these seasons the club was managed by Graeme Souness; the latter six under the stewardship of Walter Smith.

Notable seasons included 1990–91, which culminated in a last-day finale, Rangers securing a 2–0 victory at Ibrox over Aberdeen, who needed only a draw to secure the championship. Season 1992–93 was notable for a domestic treble of trophies, as well an extended run in the inaugural UEFA Champions League, the club at one stage only one goal from securing a place in the final.

Rangers' ninth consecutive championship title was secured at Tannadice Park on 7 May 1997, with a single-goal victory over Dundee United.

Dick Advocaat, Alex McLeish and Paul Le Guen
In 1998, Dutchman Dick Advocaat became the club's first foreign manager. Nine-in-a-row era stalwarts having moved on, Advocaat invested heavily in the team with immediate results, leading the club to their sixth domestic treble. The league championship was won with a 3–0 victory at Celtic Park on 2 May 1999. A second-consecutive league title was won by a record 21-point margin, the club securing a domestic double with a 4–0 Scottish Cup final victory over Aberdeen. Rangers' campaign in the Champions League saw them defeat UEFA Cup winners Parma en route.

Advocaat's third season saw Rangers fail to compete domestically against Celtic under new manager Martin O'Neill. Despite investment in the team, including Tore Andre Flo for a club-record £12 million, European success beyond the Champions League group stages again proved elusive. After a slow start to the following season, Advocaat resigned from his post in December 2001 and was replaced by Alex McLeish.

In his first full campaign, the 2002–03 season saw McLeish become the sixth Rangers manager to deliver a domestic treble. The championship was won on goal difference during a dramatic final day 6–1 triumph over Dunfermline Athletic at Ibrox, securing Rangers' 50th league title, the first club in the world to achieve the feat. Major expenditure sanctioned by chairman David Murray had burdened Rangers with considerable debts in the region of £52m. The club's worsening financial state saw many of the team's top players leave in the summer of 2003, the following season failing to deliver any trophies, only the second such occasion since 1985–86.

The 2004–05 season restored success to Rangers, who were boosted by signings such as Jean-Alain Boumsong, Dado Pršo and Nacho Novo, along with the return of former captain Barry Ferguson after a spell in England with Blackburn Rovers. The club's league championship triumph culminated in a dramatic final-day finish. The destination of the trophy changed unexpectedly, with Celtic conceding late goals to Motherwell at Fir Park whilst Rangers led against Hibernian, requiring the helicopter carrying the SPL trophy to change direction and deliver the prize to the Easter Road ground in Leith.

Despite beginning as favourites to retain the championship, Rangers suffered an unprecedented run of poor results between September and November, a club-record run of ten games without a win. Included within this period, a 1–1 draw with Inter Milan took Rangers into the last 16 of the Champions League, the first Scottish team to achieve the feat since 1993, the club eventually exiting on the away goals rule to Villarreal. On 9 February 2006, it was announced by David Murray that McLeish would be standing down as manager at the end of that season.

Frenchman Paul Le Guen replaced Alex McLeish as manager after season 2005–06. The season started with an early exit from the League Cup whilst Celtic built a commanding lead at the top of the table. In the UEFA Cup, Rangers became the first Scottish side to qualify for the last 32 of the competition, since the introduction of the group phase, after finishing their group unbeaten. However, amid claims of disharmony between the manager and captain Barry Ferguson, it was announced on 4 January 2007 that Le Guen had left Rangers by mutual consent.

Walter Smith's return and Ally McCoist 
On 10 January 2007, former boss Walter Smith resigned from his post as Scotland manager to return to the Ibrox helm, with Ally McCoist as assistant manager.

The following season Rangers contested the UEFA Cup after dropping into the competition from the Champions League. The club reached the final, defeating Panathinaikos, Werder Bremen, Sporting Lisbon and Fiorentina along the way. The final in Manchester against Zenit St. Petersburg, who were managed by former Rangers manager Dick Advocaat, ended in a 2–0 defeat. An estimated 200,000 supporters travelled to Manchester for the event, and the 2008 UEFA Cup Final riots occurred.

The 2008–09 season saw Rangers recover from an early exit from the UEFA Champions League to FBK Kaunas of Lithuania. The club secured its 52nd league championship on the last day of the season with a 3–0 victory at Dundee United. Rangers also successfully defended the Scottish Cup, defeating Falkirk 1–0 in the final.

The 2009–10 season saw Rangers reach their fifth consecutive domestic final: against St Mirren in the Scottish League Cup, the club overcame a two-men deficit from red cards, a late deciding goal from Kenny Miller securing the victory. The league championship title was retained, with three matches remaining, at Easter Road, defeating Hibernian 1–0 with a Kyle Lafferty goal. The 2010–11 season, Smith's final season in charge, saw Rangers retain the League Cup, defeating Celtic at Hampden with a Nikica Jelavić goal in extra time. A third consecutive title was won by beating Kilmarnock 5–1 on the last day of the season, Smith's final match in charge of the club.

Ally McCoist took over from Walter Smith in June 2011 but season 2011–12 started with Rangers eliminated from two European competitions before the end of August: losing to Swedish side Malmö FF in the Champions League third round qualifying match, and to Slovenian side Maribor in a Europa League qualifying match. While good league form saw Rangers in top spot after being unbeaten for the first 15 games, they were knocked out of the League Cup by Falkirk and the Scottish Cup by Dundee Utd at Ibrox. Rangers were placed into administration on 14 February 2012 resulting in the club being deducted 10 points as per SPL rules. Though Rangers avoided having Celtic win the championship at Ibrox on 25 March by winning the game 3–2, Rangers ultimately finished 20 points behind Celtic in second place.

Insolvency and the lower leagues
On 1 June 2012, after four months in administration, a failure to reach a CVA agreement with creditors led to The Rangers Football Club plc (since renamed RFC 2012 plc) entering the process of liquidation. The administrators completed a sale of the business and assets to a new company, Sevco Scotland Ltd (which later renamed itself The Rangers Football Club Ltd), though most first-team players refused to transfer across. The new company failed to secure the transfer of Rangers' previous place in the Scottish Premier League, but were later accepted into the Scottish Football League. Rangers were awarded associate membership and placed in the lowest division, the Third, rather than the First Division as the SPL and SFA had sought. The transfer of Rangers' SFA membership was agreed by the SFA upon acceptance of a number of conditions, including a one-year transfer ban, in time for the club to begin the 2012–13 season.

With most key Rangers players having refused to transfer to the new company, a very different Rangers team lined up for the first league match in the Third Division though it secured a comfortable 5–1 victory over East Stirlingshire in front of a crowd of 49,118, a world record for a football match in a fourth tier league. Away from home, Rangers started their league campaign with three successive draws before losing 1–0 to Stirling Albion, at the time the bottom club in the country. Rangers were defeated in the third round of the Scottish Challenge Cup by Queen of the South at Ibrox, in the quarter-finals of the Scottish League Cup at home to Inverness Caledonian Thistle and in the fifth round of the Scottish Cup by Dundee United. Rangers beat their own new record against Queens Park with an attendance of 49,463 and again against Stirling Albion with an attendance of 49,913.
Rangers clinched the Third Division title on 30 March after a goalless draw at Montrose.

Apart from being defeated 2–1 by Forfar Athletic in the first round of the League Cup on 3 August, season 2013–14 got off to an excellent start with Rangers winning maximum league points in their first 15 games in League One, before being held to a draw at home by Stranraer on Boxing Day 2013. Rangers secured the League One title and promotion to Scottish football's second tier on 12 March 2014 and went on to end the season unbeaten in league football. Rangers also reached the final of the Scottish Challenge Cup, in which they lost to Raith Rovers and the semi-final of the Scottish Cup, in which they lost 3–1 at Ibrox to Dundee United.

Playing in the Scottish Championship in season 2014–15 provided Rangers with a more difficult challenge, with the club losing home and away to both Hibernian and Hearts and also losing away to Queen of the South in the first half of the season. Rangers also failed to beat Alloa either home or away in the league before losing 3–2 to Alloa in the semi-final of the Scottish Challenge Cup. Amid mounting criticism, McCoist submitted his resignation intending to honour his 12 months notice period but was placed on gardening leave and replaced by Kenny McDowall on a caretaker basis. McDowall remained in charge for just three months before resigning in March 2015. During his time in charge, Rangers won just three matches. Rangers then named former player Stuart McCall as their third manager of the season for the remaining fixtures. Under McCall, Rangers finished third in the league and then reached the Premiership play-off final, which they lost 6–1 on aggregate to Motherwell.

Warburton, Premiership return, Caixinha and Murty
In June 2015 it was announced that Mark Warburton had been appointed manager on a three-year deal. Rangers went on to win the 2015–16 Scottish Championship and automatic promotion to the Scottish Premiership, ending their four-year stint in the lower divisions. The club also reached the 2016 Scottish Cup Final, beating Old Firm rivals Celtic in the semi-final at Hampden, before losing to Hibernian in the final. After a poor first half of the 2016–17 season, Mark Warburton and David Weir left Rangers on 10 February 2017, and Graeme Murty was placed in caretaker control of the Rangers first team. Pedro Caixinha eventually took over as permanent manager.

Caixinha's first full season started with Rangers suffering one of the worst results in their history. After winning 1–0 at Ibrox, Rangers lost 2–0 to Luxembourg minnows Progrès Niederkorn, resulting in Rangers being knocked out 2–1 on aggregate in the first qualifying round of the 2017–18 Europa League. Progrès had never before won a tie and had only ever scored once before in European competition. After that disappointing start to the season the form did not improve, with notable results including a 2–0 reverse to Celtic at home in the league and defeat to Motherwell in the Scottish League Cup semi-final by the same scoreline. On 26 October, a day after a 95th-minute equaliser at Ibrox by last-placed Kilmarnock saw Rangers draw 1–1, Caixinha was sacked and Graeme Murty took over as caretaker manager again. The Portuguese manager's reign was described as "a desperate mess from start to finish".

In late December, after a search for a more experienced manager proved unsuccessful, including a failed attempt to appoint Aberdeen manager Derek McInnes, Murty (who had won back-to-back games over Aberdeen  and also defeated Hibernian away from home during his interim spell) was appointed to the role until the end of the season. On 1 May 2018, Murty's second spell in charge ended prematurely when he was sacked as manager following a 5–0 defeat to Celtic which resulted in Celtic winning their 7th consecutive league title. Rangers again ended the season in 3rd place, behind Celtic and Aberdeen for the second year in a row.

The Gerrard era
On 4 May 2018, former Liverpool and England captain Steven Gerrard was confirmed as the new manager of Rangers on a four-year contract. Gerrard's era started successfully with Rangers remaining unbeaten in their first 12 games, clinching a place in the UEFA Europa League group stage in the process. However, Rangers were then defeated by Celtic in the first Old Firm match of the season, and the following month were eliminated from the League Cup by Aberdeen. On 29 December, Rangers defeated Celtic at Ibrox to inflict Brendan Rodgers' first defeat in 13 Old Firm games; Rangers first win over Celtic since a Scottish Cup victory in April 2016 and their first league win over Celtic since March 2012. Aberdeen knocked Rangers out of a cup for the second time in the season after securing a 2–0 victory in the Scottish Cup at Ibrox on 12 March 2019.

Season 2019–20 began with Rangers again qualifying for the UEFA Europa League group stage before losing 2–0 to Celtic at Ibrox in the first Old Firm match of the season on 1 September. The following day, the club signed Ryan Kent from Liverpool for £7m. Rangers reached the final of the League Cup but despite a dominant performance were beaten 1–0 by Celtic. On 12 December Rangers progressed to the UEFA Europa League Round of 32 as group runners-up after a 1–1 draw with BSC Young Boys which secured European football beyond Christmas for the first time since the 2010–11 season. On 29 December, Rangers beat Celtic 2–1 at Celtic Park, their first win at their arch rival's stadium since October 2010. However, a slump in form thereafter, including losing to Hearts in the Scottish Cup and Hamilton in the league within 5 days, left Rangers 13 points adrift of Celtic a week into March. However, all professional football in Scotland was suspended later that month due to the COVID-19 pandemic in the United Kingdom. On 18 May 2020, the SPFL officially ended the season, and Celtic were awarded the league title which was determined by points per game.

On 7 March 2021, Rangers won the league title for the first time in 10 years, going on to end the league campaign undefeated with a club record 102 points.

Giovanni van Bronckhorst and Europa League Final 
Midway through the 2021–22 season, Steven Gerrard left Rangers for Aston Villa, and was replaced by former Rangers midfielder Giovanni van Bronckhorst on 11 November 2021. He led Rangers to their first European final in fourteen years, beating Borussia Dortmund, Red Star Belgrade, Braga and RB Leipzig on the way to facing Eintracht Frankfurt in the 2022 UEFA Europa League Final. He also took the club to their first Scottish Cup final in six years, in which they beat Hearts.

In the 2022–23 season, Rangers qualified for the UEFA Champions League group stage for the first time since the 2010–11 season. They went on to lose all six group matches against Napoli, Liverpool, and Ajax with only two goals scored and a −20 goal difference overall, setting the worst performance in a Champions League group stage, surpassing Dinamo Zagreb's −19 goal difference in the 2011–12 season.

Crest and colours

Crest
Unusually for a football club, Rangers have two different official crests. Today the original scroll crest appears on the club's strips whereas the lion rampant club crest is used by the media, on club merchandise and on official club documents. Both crests have undergone minor variations since their introduction. It is believed that the scroll crest, representing the letters RFC overlapping, has been used since the club's formation in 1872, although the oldest remaining piece of memorabilia containing this crest is from the 1881–82 season. The scroll crest was replaced in 1959 with the lion rampant club crest which featured a lion rampant, an old-style football and the club's motto Ready, which was shortened from Aye Ready (meaning Always Ready in Scots), all surrounded by the team name, Rangers Football Club. The lion rampant club crest was modernised in 1968; the lion rampant, team name, club motto and old style football all remained. It was again updated slightly in the early 1990s and then once more in 2020 to the current version. The modern circular crest is regularly used on club merchandise and by the media; it has never featured prominently on the club strip. In 1968 the scroll crest made a return appearing on the chest of the club shirt for the first time while the modernised club crest was still the club's official logo. The scroll crest first appeared on the teams shorts for the start of the 1978–79 season.

The way the scroll crest has appeared on the club shirt has varied slightly through the years. Between 1990 and 1994 'Rangers Football Club' and the 'Ready' motto appeared above and below the Crest respectively. Between 1997 and 1999 the scroll crest featured within a shield. After a successful end to the season in 2003, which delivered Rangers a Domestic Treble and their 50th league title; five stars were added to the top of the scroll crest, one for every ten titles won by the club. The team wore a special crest on 8 December 2012 in a home league match against Stirling Albion, to commemorate the 140th anniversary of their formation. '1872–2012' appeared above the scroll crest with the words '140 years' featuring below.

Colours
The club colours of Rangers F.C. are royal blue, white and red. However, for the majority of the first forty-eight years of Rangers existence the club played in a plain lighter blue home shirt. The only deviation from this was a four-season period from 1879 when the side wore the lighter shade of blue and white in a hooped style. Traditionally this is accompanied by white shorts (often with royal blue and/or red trim) and black socks with red turn-downs. Rangers moved from the lighter shade of blue to royal blue in 1921, and have had a royal blue home shirt every year since. Black socks were first included in 1883 for five seasons before disappearing for eight years but became a more permanent fixture from 1896 onwards. When the red turn-downs were added to the socks in 1904, the strip began to look more like the modern day Rangers home kit. Occasionally the home kit will be altered by the shorts and socks, sometimes replacing the black socks with white ones; or replacing the white shorts and black socks combination with royal blue shorts and socks.

The basic design of Rangers away strips has changed far more than the traditional home strip. Rangers original change strip, used between 1876 and 1879, was all white featuring blue and white hooped socks and a light blue six pointed star on the chest. White and red have been the most common colours for Rangers alternate strips, though dark and light blue have also featured highly. In 1994 Rangers introduced a third kit. This is usually worn if both the home and away kits clash with their opponents. The colours used in the third kits have included combinations of white, red, dark and light blue as well as black. Orange and blue change strips, first seen in 1993–94, worn once in 2002–03 and reintroduced in 2018–19 and 2022–23, have caused controversy because the colours were seen as referencing the Orange Order.

Kit suppliers and shirt sponsors
Since 1978 when Rangers signed a deal with Umbro they have had a specific kit manufacturer and since 1984 have had a kit sponsor. The following tables detail Rangers' shirt sponsors and kit suppliers by year:

When Rangers played French sides in 1996–97 and 1997–98, they wore the logo of Center Parcs instead of McEwan's Lager, due to a French ban on alcohol advertising. Later matches in France (when the club was sponsored by Carling) saw the club play with no shirt sponsor, in 2006 and 2007. 

During 32Red's sponsorship, Rangers faced NK Osijek in 2018–19 wearing unsponsored training gear due to Croatia's ban on gambling advertising. Team Talk, an arm of the Rangers Charity Foundation, appeared on the shirts on two occasions in 2021–22: away in Leipzig, as Unibet hold no licence for Germany; and in the 2021–22 UEFA Europa League final against Eintracht Frankfurt, as gambling advertisements are banned in Spain.

Mascot
Broxi Bear is the official mascot of Rangers. Its name is derived from Rangers' home stadium, Broxi being an anagram of Ibrox. Broxi is a brown bear with blue inner ears and nose, wearing a Rangers strip. He made his first appearance in a 2–2 draw against Raith Rovers on 13 November 1993. Broxi was later accompanied by his "wife" Roxi and their "son" Boris although from 2001 Roxi and Boris no longer made any on-field appearances at Ibrox. Roxi and Boris did continue to appear on some club merchandise. On 9 September 2017, Roxi and Boris were re-introduced before a 4–1 win against Dundee.

Stadium and training facility

The club used a variety of grounds in Glasgow as a venue for home matches in the years between 1872 and 1899. The first was Fleshers' Haugh, situated on Glasgow Green, followed by Burnbank Park in the Kelvinbridge area of the city, and then Kinning Park for ten years from the mid-1870s to the mid-1880s. From February of the 1886–87 season, Cathkin Park was used until the first Ibrox Park, in the Ibrox area of south-west Glasgow, was inaugurated for the following season. Ibrox Stadium in its current incarnation was originally designed by the architect Archibald Leitch, a Rangers fan who also played a part in the design of, among others, Old Trafford in Manchester and Highbury in London. The stadium was inaugurated on 30 December 1899, and Rangers defeated Hearts 3–1 in the first match held there.

Rangers' training facility is located in the Auchenhowie area of Milngavie, Glasgow; it was initially named Murray Park after former chairman and owner Sir David Murray, but has since been renamed. It was proposed by then-manager Dick Advocaat upon his arrival at the club in 1998. It was completed in 2001 at a cost of £14 million. The training centre was the first purpose-built facility of its kind in Scotland, and incorporates features including nine football pitches, a gym, a hydrotherapy pool, and a video-editing suite. Rangers' youth teams are also accommodated at the centre, with around 140 players between under-10 and under-19 age groups using the facilities. International club teams playing in Scotland, as well as national sides, have previously used the centre for training, and Advocaat's South Korea team used it for training prior to the 2006 World Cup.

Supporters and rivalries

Rangers are one of the best supported clubs in Europe, the figure for the 2017–18 season being in the 20 largest home league attendances in Europe. A study of stadium attendance figures from 2013 to 2018 by the CIES Football Observatory ranked Rangers at 18th in the world during that period, with Rangers' accounting for 27.4% of total Scottish attendance, placing them 8th overall for national attendance share.

The Rangers Worldwide Alliance is a network of supporters clubs that was set up for the benefit of the club and the fans. There are more than 600 registered supporters clubs with over 30,000 registered members and these continue to grow, in keeping with the vision the club initially had. There are also many unregistered supporters clubs currently active. The official club website lists over 100 supporters' clubs in Great Britain and Northern Ireland, with over 100 further clubs spread across over 35 countries around the world. It includes representatives from all over the globe – including Africa, Asia, Europe, North America, South America and Australia – as well as closer to home in the United Kingdom. Beyond Europe, there are supporters clubs registered in far-flung locations such as Nigeria, South Africa, Cameroon, Saudi Arabia, United Arab Emirates, Israel, Qatar, Bahrain, China, India, Japan, Thailand, South Korea, Malaysia, Singapore, United States of America, Canada, Brazil, Argentina, Australia, New Zealand and Antarctica. One of Hong Kong's most popular football clubs Hong Kong Rangers F.C. was set up by an expatriate fan.

Rangers fans have contributed to several records for high attendances, including the highest home attendance for a league fixture, 118,567 on 2 January 1939. Rangers record highest attendance was against Hibernian on 27 March 1948 in the Scottish Cup semi-final at Hampden Park. Rangers beat Hibernian 1–0 in front of a packed 143,570 crowd.

In 2008, up to 200,000 Rangers supporters, many without match tickets, travelled to Manchester for the UEFA Cup Final. Despite most supporters behaving "impeccably", Rangers fans were involved in serious trouble and rioting. A minority of fans rioted in the city centre, clashing violently with police and damaging property, resulting in 42 being arrested for a variety of offences.

In 2022, Rangers also took the largest ever travelling support abroad when an estimated 100,000 fans arrived in Seville for the UEFA Europa League Final. No arrests were made in Seville as Rangers supporters impressed the Spanish police with their good behaviour.

Supporters group Club 1872 are the sixth-largest shareholder of the club.

Rivalries

The club's most distinct rivalry is with Glasgow neighbours Celtic F.C.; the two clubs are collectively known as the Old Firm. Rangers' traditional support is largely drawn from the Protestant Unionist community, whilst Celtic's traditional support is largely drawn from the Catholic community. The first Old Firm match was won by Celtic and there have been over four hundred matches played to date. The Old Firm rivalry has fuelled many assaults, sometimes leading to deaths, on Old Firm derby days; an activist group that monitors sectarian activity in Glasgow has reported that on Old Firm weekends, admissions to hospital emergency rooms have increased over normal levels and journalist Franklin Foer noted that in the period from 1996 to 2003, eight deaths in Glasgow were directly linked to Old Firm matches, as well as hundreds of assaults.

The bitter rivalry with Aberdeen developed following an incident in the 1979 League Cup final when Rangers' Derek Johnstone provoked the fury of the Dons support with what they believed was a blatant dive but which resulted in the dismissal of Aberdeen's Doug Rougvie and a Rangers victory. Then, the following season, Aberdeen's John McMaster had to be given the kiss of life at Ibrox after a stamp on his throat by Willie Johnston. Relations between fans were further soured during a league match on 8 October 1988, when Aberdeen player Neil Simpson's tackle on Rangers' Ian Durrant resulted in Durrant being injured for two years. Resentment continued and in 1998 an article in Rangers match programme branded Aberdeen fans "scum", although Rangers later issued a "full and unreserved apology" to Aberdeen and their supporters, which was accepted by Aberdeen.

Rangers' relaunch in the Third Division in the 2012–13 season led to the club's original rivalry with Queen's Park being renewed for the first time since 1958 in the league. Rangers and Queen's Park first played each other in March 1879, some nine years before the start of the Old Firm rivalry. Matches with Queen's Park were advertised as the "Original Glasgow derby" by Rangers and the Scottish media; and as the "Oldest Derby in the World" by Queen's Park.

Sectarianism

John Ure Primrose, chairman of Rangers from 1912 to 1923, has been described as sharpening Rangers' Protestant Unionist identity and anti-Catholic identity, contributing to the absence of openly Catholic players from the team. From the early 20th century onwards, Rangers had a policy of not signing Catholic players, or employing them in other prominent roles.

In 1989, Rangers signed Mo Johnston, "their first major Roman Catholic signing". Johnston was the first high-profile Catholic to sign for the club since the World War I era, though other Catholics had signed for Rangers before. Since Johnston's signing, an influx of overseas footballers has contributed to Catholic players becoming commonplace at Rangers. In 1999, Lorenzo Amoruso became the first Catholic captain of the club.

Rangers partnered with Celtic to form the Old Firm Alliance, an initiative aimed at educating children from across Glasgow about issues like healthy eating and fitness, as well as awareness of anti-social behaviour, sectarianism and racism. The club's Follow With Pride campaign was launched in 2007 to improve the club's image and build on previous anti-sectarian and anti-racist campaigns. William Gaillard, UEFA's Director of Communications, commended the SFA and Scottish clubs, including Rangers, for their actions in fighting discrimination. In September 2007, UEFA praised Rangers for the measures the club has taken against sectarianism.

However, sectarian chanting by supporters has continued to incur criticism and sanctions upon the club as well as convictions against individuals identified. In 1999, the vice-chairman of The Rangers Football Club Ltd, Donald Findlay, resigned after being filmed singing sectarian songs during a supporters club event. UEFA's Control and Disciplinary Body has punished Rangers for incidents during European ties, most notably Villarreal in 2006, Osasuna in 2007, PSV Eindhoven in 2011, and at Ibrox in 2019. In February 2015, following sectarian singing from Rangers fans at a match at Raith Rovers, the SPFL came in for criticism for their failure or inability to deal with the issue. However, there have been cases of the police and courts taking action, with Rangers fans having been charged, convicted and jailed for sectarian behaviour.

Rangers' use of orange and blue change strips, first worn in 1993–94, once in 2002–03 and reintroduced in 2018–19 and 2022–23, has caused controversy because the colours are seen as referencing the Orange Order.

Friendships
Supporters of Rangers have a fan friendship with the Northern Irish club Linfield F.C., dating back to 1920. Two of the founders of the club Moses and Peter McNeil have a Northern Irish connection through the County Down birth of their mother Jean Bain, who after moving to Scotland for work in the mid-19th century married a Scotsman, John McNeil. From Rangers formation to the present day, the club have had 32 players who were born in either Northern Ireland, the Republic of Ireland and previously Ireland (from 1882 to 1950). A number were former Linfield players, and they have contributed much to the success of Rangers Football Club. Three former Northern Irish players have captained Rangers – Bert Manderson, John McClelland and Steven Davis; six from a Northern Irish connection have been elevated to the Rangers 'Hall of Fame' and one – Jimmy Nicholl – was the club's assistant manager in 2018.

The fans of Rangers also have a fan-friendship with the German club Hamburger SV, dating from the 1970s when Scots moved to the German port in search of work and reinforced by their shared affection for the midfielder Jörg Albertz.
This link was formalised in February 2021 with the formation of an official club partnership between the two sides.

Ownership and finances

From incorporation to liquidation
On 27 May 1899, Rangers Football Club incorporated, forming The Rangers Football Club Ltd. No single shareholding exceeded 50% until 1985 when the Lawrence Group increased its shareholding in Rangers to a 52% majority, following a deal with then club vice-chairman Jack Gillespie. In November 1988, head of the Lawrence Group Lawrence Marlborough sold out to David Murray for £6 million. In 2000, David Murray decided to list the company on the stock exchange (making it a public limited company), with the name of the company being changed to The Rangers Football Club plc.

On 6 May 2011, Craig Whyte bought David Murray's shares for £1. On 13 February 2012, Whyte filed legal papers at the Court of Session giving notice of his intention to appoint administrators. The next day, The Rangers Football Club plc – which was subsequently renamed RFC 2012 plc – entered administration over non-payment of £9 million in PAYE and VAT taxes to HM Revenue and Customs. In April the administrators estimated that the club's total debts could top £134m which was largely dependent on the outcome of a First Tier Tax Tribunal concerning a disputed tax bill in relation to an Employee Benefit Trust ("EBT") scheme employed by the club since 2001. However, on 20 November 2012, the Tribunal ruled in favour of Rangers. Had that decision been upheld the tax bill could have been significantly reduced from an estimated £74m to under £2m. An Upper Tribunal upheld the decision in 2014. HMRC then appealed to the Court of Session, which ruled in November 2015 that Rangers should have paid tax and national insurance on the EBT payments.

On 25 June 2012, the Crown Office asked Strathclyde Police to investigate the purchase of Rangers and the club's subsequent financial management during Whyte's tenure.

Charles Green agreed a deal with the administrators of The Rangers Football Club plc to purchase the company for £8.5 million if a proposed CVA was agreed or to purchase its business and assets for a £5.5million if the proposed CVA were to be rejected. On 14 June 2012, the formal rejection of the proposed CVA meant that the company would enter the liquidation process. The accountancy firm BDO was appointed to investigate the years of financial mismanagement at the club.

Current corporate identity
On 14 June 2012, hours after the CVA's rejection, Sevco Scotland Ltd, a new company formed by Charles Green's consortium for this eventuality, completed the purchase of the business and assets of The Rangers Football Club Plc and then, on 18 June 2012, formally applied to acquire the SPL share of The Rangers Football Club plc. On 4 July, SPL clubs voted by 10–1 to reject the application with Kilmarnock abstaining and the old Rangers company voting in favour. Thereafter, an application to the Scottish Football League was successful with Rangers securing associate membership on 13 July 2012 at an SFL meeting by a vote of 29–1. The SFL member clubs voted that Rangers should enter the fourth tier of Scottish Football, Scottish Third Division for the 2012–13 season, rather than the Scottish First Division.

An application was made for a transfer of SFA membership on 29 June 2012, with the new company applying for the transfer of the membership of The Rangers Football Club plc. Agreement was reached on the transfer with the new company accepting a number of conditions relating to the old company.

At the end of 2012, Rangers International Football Club plc became the holding company for the group, having acquired The Rangers Football Club Ltd on the basis of a one for one share exchange. In 2013, after its first 13 months, the company reported operating losses of £14.4m. Thereafter it has continued to post annual operating losses: £9.8m in 2014 and £9.9m in 2015, £2.5m in 2016, £6.3m in 2017 and £13.2m in 2018.

Major shareholders (4% or above)

Social responsibility

Support for charities

The Rangers Charity Foundation was created in 2002 and participates in a wide range of charitable work, regularly involving Rangers staff and star players. The foundation also has partnerships with UNICEF, The Prostate Cancer Charity and Erskine, and is responsible for over £2.3 million in donations. As well as fundraising, the Rangers Charity Foundation regularly bring sick, disabled and disadvantaged children to attend matches and tours at Ibrox, with the chance to meet the players.

Through its support of the Rangers Charity Foundation, the club has helped a number of charities with support and financial donations. In 2008, the club became the first Scottish side to be selected as a partner club of UNICEF. The club's Charity Foundation has backed initiatives in Togo and India as well as funding one million vaccinations for a children's vaccination programme. The club has been a firm supporter of Erskine, a charity which provides long-term medical care for veterans of the British Armed Forces, and in 2012, donated £25,000 to fund projects within their care homes. In January 2015, Rangers hosted a charity match for the benefit of former player Fernando Ricksen who had been diagnosed with Motor neurone disease; this raised £320,000 for him and MND Scotland.

Work in the community
Alongside its work with numerous charities, the club and its Charity Foundation operate various initiatives within the community including courses to help Armed Forces veterans overcome addictions, to raise awareness of social issues and help unemployed people back into work. In October 2015, the club launched its Ready2Succeed programme which was a ten-week course designed to develop participants confidence and employability skills by engaging with football and fitness. Rangers first-team players also visit the Royal Hospital for Children in Glasgow every year during the festive period where they hand out presents to the children and donate money to the hospital activity fund.

Popular culture
In 2002, former Rangers striker Ally McCoist starred in Robert Duvall's film A Shot at Glory as Jackie McQuillan where he would play against Rangers in the Scottish Cup Final for "Kilnockie F.C.", a fictional side.

In 2003, a Scottish television documentary series filmed by BBC Scotland, Blue Heaven, followed aspiring young footballers at Rangers as they tried to forge a career in football. The series was originally broadcast in the winter of 2003 with a follow up episode in 2011.

In 2008, celebrity chef Gordon Ramsay returned to Rangers, the club he played for as a youth, to teach them how to cook in Series 4, Episode 12 of The F Word.

Owing to the notoriety of the "Rangers Inter City Firm", a football firm associated with the club, Rangers have also featured in television documentaries and books about football hooliganism, including Series 1, Episode 5 of The Real Football Factories presented by English actor Danny Dyer on Bravo in 2006, during which he visits his first Old Firm match and meets football casuals from Rangers, Celtic, Aberdeen, Hibernian, Dundee United and Dundee.

The club featured on BBC Scotland comedy Scotch and Wry in 1979 in a scene where Manager (Rikki Fulton) and Chief Scout (Gregor Fisher) unknowingly sign a young Catholic footballer (Gerard Kelly) but then try to void his contract to avoid publicly breaking the club's "No Catholic" signing policy after finding out.

Rangers have appeared in theatre a number of times in shows such as Follow Follow: The Rangers Story at the King's Theatre in 1994 starring Scottish actors Barbara Rafferty, Alexander Morton, Jonathan Watson, Iain Robertson, Ronnie Letham and Stuart Bowman; Singin' I'm No A Billy He's A Tim at the Pavilion Theatre in 2009; Divided City at the Citizens Theatre in 2011; and, more recently, Billy and Tim and the Wee Glesga Ghost in 2015, and Rally Roon the Rangers in 2019 and 2022, both at the Pavilion Theatre in Glasgow.

William Orcutt Cushing's hymn "Follow On", also known as "Down in the Valley with My Saviour I Would Go" or "I Will Follow Jesus", has been adopted as the anthem of Rangers in their club song "Follow Follow". The club has also played the Tina Turner song "The Best"  when the teams exit the tunnel before kick off.

Records

Club

Unbeaten League Seasons
1898–99 (Rangers won all of their 18 league matches) and 2020–21
Highest attendance
143,570 vs Hibernian, 27 March 1948
UK record home attendance
118,567 vs Celtic, 2 January 1939
Highest European attendance
100,000 vs Dynamo Kyiv, 16 September 1987
World record fourth-tier attendance
50,048 vs Berwick Rangers, 4 May 2013

Highest scoring match
14–2 vs Whitehill, 29 September 1883

14–2 vs Blairgowrie, 20 January 1934
Record league victory
10–0 vs Hibernian, 24 December 1898

Joint world record trebles won
7
World record trophies won
119

Player

 Record appearances
Dougie Gray, 940 appearances, 1925–1947

 Most league appearances
Sandy Archibald, 513 appearances, 1917–1934

 Record goalscorer
Jimmy Smith, 381 goals, 1929–1946

 Most league goals
Jimmy Smith, 300 goals, 1929–1946

 Most Scotland caps whilst playing at Rangers
Ally McCoist, 61 caps, 1983–1998

Players

First-team squad

On loan

Academy squads
For more details on the academy squads, see Rangers F.C. B Team and Academy.

Retired and reserved numbers

Number 12 is reserved for the fans (often referred to as the 12th man)

Staff

Board of directors
Rangers F.C. is owned and operated by The Rangers Football Club Limited ("TRFCL"), which, in turn, is a subsidiary of the holding company Rangers International Football Club Plc ("RIFC"). The latter company, RIFC, also owns other corporations related to Rangers including Rangers Retail Ltd, Rangers Media Ltd and Garrion Security Services Ltd who are responsible for providing match day security at Ibrox Stadium.

As of 31 January 2023
Rangers International Football Club Plc

The Rangers Football Club Ltd

First-team staff
As of 31 January 2023

Managers

Eighteen men (including two repeat appointments) have been manager of Rangers during the club's history. In addition, nine men have taken charge of the side on a caretaker basis, while five served as secretaries choosing the team, prior to the appointment of the club's first full-time  manager, William Wilton, in 1899.

The longest-serving manager was Bill Struth, who served for 34 years and 26 days. Rangers have had four foreign managers during their history: Dick Advocaat, Paul Le Guen, Pedro Caixinha and Giovanni van Bronckhorst. Graeme Souness is the only player-manager during Rangers' history. There have been two repeat appointments: Jock Wallace and Walter Smith.

The most successful manager, in terms of the number of trophies won, is Bill Struth, with eighteen League titles, ten Scottish Cups and two League Cups. Rangers' other manager with notable success was William Waddell, who won the European Cup Winners' Cup.

Honours

Domestic honours
 Scottish first-tier League Championships: 55 (record)
 1890–91, 1898–99, 1899–1900, 1900–01, 1901–02, 1910–11, 1911–12, 1912–13, 1917–18, 1919–20, 1920–21, 1922–23, 1923–24, 1924–25, 1926–27, 1927–28, 1928–29, 1929–30, 1930–31, 1932–33, 1933–34, 1934–35, 1936–37, 1938–39, 1946–47, 1948–49, 1949–50, 1952–53, 1955–56, 1956–57, 1958–59, 1960–61, 1962–63, 1963–64, 1974–75, 1975–76, 1977–78, 1986–87, 1988–89, 1989–90, 1990–91, 1991–92, 1992–93, 1993–94, 1994–95, 1995–96, 1996–97, 1998–99, 1999–2000, 2002–03, 2004–05, 2008–09, 2009–10, 2010–11, 2020–21

Scottish second-tier League Championships: 1
 2015–16

Scottish third-tier League Championships: 1
 2013–14

Scottish fourth-tier League Championships: 1
 2012–13

 Scottish Cup: 34
 1893–94, 1896–97, 1897–98, 1902–03, 1927–28, 1929–30, 1931–32, 1933–34, 1934–35, 1935–36, 1947–48, 1948–49, 1949–50, 1952–53, 1959–60, 1961–62, 1962–63, 1963–64, 1965–66, 1972–73, 1975–76, 1977–78, 1978–79, 1980–81, 1991–92, 1992–93, 1995–96, 1998–99, 1999–2000, 2001–02, 2002–03, 2007–08, 2008–09, 2021–22

 Scottish League Cup: 27 (record)
 1946–47, 1948–49, 1960–61, 1961–62, 1963–64, 1964–65, 1970–71, 1975–76, 1977–78, 1978–79, 1981–82, 1983–84, 1984–85, 1986–87, 1987–88, 1988–89, 1990–91, 1992–93, 1993–94, 1996–97, 1998–99, 2001–02, 2002–03, 2004–05, 2007–08, 2009–10, 2010–11

Scottish Challenge Cup: 1
 2015–16

European honours

 European Cup Winners' Cup: 1
1971–72
 Runners-up (2): 1960–61, 1966–67
 UEFA Cup/UEFA Europa League:
 Runners-up (2): 2007–08, 2021–22
 UEFA Super Cup:
 Runners-up (1): 1972

Doubles and trebles
League Title, Scottish Cup, League Cup: 7
 1948–49, 1963–64, 1975–76, 1977–78, 1992–93, 1998–99, 2002–03
League Title and Scottish Cup: 11
 1927–28, 1929–30, 1933–34, 1934–35, 1949–50, 1952–53, 1962–63, 1991–92, 1995–96, 1999–2000, 2008–09
League Title and League Cup: 10
 1946–47, 1960–61, 1986–87, 1988–89, 1990–91, 1993–94, 1996–97, 2004–05, 2009–10, 2010–11
Scottish Cup and League Cup: 4
 1961–62, 1978–79, 2001–02, 2007–08

Notable statistics
Rangers became the first British side to reach a UEFA-sanctioned European final in 1961.

UEFA club coefficient rankings

Notable former players

Club captains
For further information, see Rangers club captains

Greatest-ever team
The following team was voted the greatest ever Rangers team by supporters in 1999. When the vote was launched it was feared that younger voters would ignore the great service of many of the pre-war stars (notably the most successful captain and most successful manager the club has ever had, Davie Meiklejohn and Bill Struth respectively). When the ballot was launched Donald Findlay stated it would be limited to post Second World War players because "few can recall players of these earlier eras":
  Andy Goram
  Sandy Jardine
  Richard Gough
  Terry Butcher
  John Greig – voted Rangers' greatest-ever player
  Brian Laudrup – voted Rangers' greatest-ever foreign player
  Paul Gascoigne
  Jim Baxter – voted Rangers' third greatest-ever player
  Davie Cooper
  Ally McCoist – voted Rangers' second greatest-ever player
  Mark Hateley

Scottish Football Hall of Fame
As of 1 June 2020, 33 players and managers to have been involved with Rangers in their careers have entered the Scottish Football Hall of Fame:

  John Greig – 2004 Inaugural Inductee
  Graeme Souness – 2004 Inaugural Inductee
  Sir Alex Ferguson – 2004 Inaugural Inductee
  Jim Baxter – 2004 Inaugural Inductee
  Willie Woodburn – 2004 Inaugural Inductee
  Alex McLeish – 2005 Inductee
  Willie Waddell – 2005 Inductee
  George Young – 2005 Inductee
  Alan Morton – 2005 Inductee
  Davie Cooper – 2006 Inductee
  Brian Laudrup – 2006 Inductee
  Sandy Jardine – 2006 Inductee
  Willie Henderson – 2006 Inductee
  Richard Gough – 2006 Inductee
  Walter Smith – 2007 Inductee
  Ally McCoist – 2007 Inductee
  Eric Caldow – 2007 Inductee
  Derek Johnstone – 2008 Inductee
  Bill Struth – 2008 Inductee
  David Meiklejohn – 2009 Inductee
  Mo Johnston – 2009 Inductee
  Andy Goram – 2010 Inductee
  Robert Smyth McColl – 2011 Inductee
  Terry Butcher – 2011 Inductee
  Bob McPhail – 2012 Inductee
  Scot Symon – 2013 Inductee
  Davie Wilson – 2014 Inductee
  Bobby Brown – 2015 Inductee
  Jock Wallace – 2016 Inductee
  Archie Knox – 2018 Inductee
  Ian McMillan – 2018 Inductee
  Tommy McLean – 2019 Inductee
  Colin Stein – 2019 Inductee

Scottish FA International Roll of Honour
The Scottish FA International Roll of Honour recognises players who have gained 50 or more international caps for Scotland. As of 1 July 2021, the 10 inductees to have won caps while playing for Rangers are:

  David Weir – 2006 Inductee, 69 Caps
  Kenny Miller – 2010 Inductee, 69 Caps
  Christian Dailly – 2003 Inductee, 67 Caps
  Richard Gough – 1990 Inductee, 61 Caps
  Ally McCoist – 1996 Inductee, 61 Caps
  George Young – 1956 Inductee, 54 Caps
  Graeme Souness – 1985 Inductee, 54 Caps
  Colin Hendry – 2001 Inductee, 51 Caps
  Steven Naismith – 2019 Inductee, 51 Caps
  Alan Hutton – 2016 Inductee, 50 Caps

Scottish Sports Hall of Fame
Three Rangers players have been selected in the Scottish Sports Hall of Fame, they are:
  Jim Baxter – 2002 Inductee
  John Greig – 2002 Inductee
  Ally McCoist – 2007 Inductee

Greatest-ever Ranger
John Greig was voted the greatest ever Rangers player in 1999.
He was announced as Honorary Life President in 2015.

Sponsors
As of January 2023, Rangers are sponsored by:

Official partners
 Official Kit Manufacturer, Retail, Merchandise and Licensing Partner – Castore
 Official Club Sponsor – 32Red
 Official Presenting Partner – Park's Motor Group
 Official Upper Back of Shirt Sponsor and Logistics Partner – Seko Logistics
 Official Lower Back of Shirt Sponsor – Socomec
 Official Sleeve Partner – BOXT
 Official Training Kit Partner – Unibet
 Official Women's Partner – DCP Capital
 Official Women's Front Of Shirt Partner – BioWaveGO
 Official Academy Partner – Carrick Packaging
 Official Lager Partner – Tennent's Lager
 Official Wellness Partner – Vitality
 Official Energy Partner – Utilita Energy
 Official Digital Auction Supplier – MatchWornShirt
 Official Video Gaming Partner – EA Sports

Associate partners
 Official Snacking Partner – Cadbury
 Official Women's Back Of Shirt Partner – TGI Fridays
 Official Events Partner – Dundonald Links
 Official Scotch Whisky Partner – Douglas Laing & Co.
 Official Restaurant Partner – Black Rooster
 Official Engineering Partner – Forrest Precision Engineering
 Official Cyber Security Partner – NordVPN
 Official Air Conditioning Partner – CSD Air Conditioning

Official suppliers
 Official Business Travel Supplier – Destination Sport Travel
 Official Match Breaks Supplier – Sports Breaks
 Official Television Supplier – Sky Sports
 Official Catering Partner – Levy
 Official Soft Drink Supplier – Coca-Cola
 Official Hydration Partner – Lucozade Sport
 Official Personal Care Supplier – Molton Brown
 Official Rangers Legends Events Supplier – 5 Stars
 Official Radio Partner – Go Radio
 Official Sports Nutrition Partner – Applied Nutrition

Club & Federation partners
 Official Club Partners – All India Football Federation, Hamburger SV, Bengaluru FC, and Orange County SC.

A full list of Rangers commercial partners and sponsors can be found on the official club website and in the Rangers matchday programme, available at every home game.

See also
Football in Scotland

Notes

References

Further reading

External links

Official

News

 Club information at Fitbastats.com

 
1872 establishments in Scotland
Association football clubs established in 1872
Companies based in Glasgow
Culture in Glasgow
Football clubs in Glasgow
Football clubs in Scotland
Govan
Scottish Football League founder members
Scottish Football League teams
Scottish Premier League teams
Scottish Cup winners
Scottish Professional Football League teams
Scottish League Cup winners
Scottish Challenge Cup winners
Companies that have entered administration in the United Kingdom
UEFA Cup Winners' Cup winning clubs
Kinning Park